Vicente Flavio Sarmiento (born May 11, 1964) is an American economist, lawyer, and politician serving as a member of the Orange County Board of Supervisors from the 2nd district since 2023.  He was previously the mayor of Santa Ana from 2020 to 2022. A member of the Democratic Party, he previously served as City Councilmember representing Ward 1 from 2007 to 2020. Hailing from Quime in Bolivia's La Paz Department, he is credited as the first-ever Bolivian American mayor in the United States.

Early life and education 
Vicente Sarmiento was born on May 11, 1964 in Quime in the Inquisivi province of La Paz, Bolivia to Vicente Sr. and his wife Irma. When he was a year old, his family emigrated to California, settling in Santa Ana where his father worked as a hotel waiter while his mother provided cleaning services.

He studied at the University of California, Berkeley, where he met his wife Eva Cazas, an attorney of Mexican descent. He graduated from Berkeley with a Bachelor of Science Economics before continuing his studies at the University of California, Los Angeles, School of Law where he received his Juris Doctor. After that, he completed a Certificate Program for Senior Executives in State and Local Government at the Harvard Kennedy School of Law.

Political career 
In 1994, Sarmiento's father introduced him to Miguel A. Pulido, whose Santa Ana mayoral campaign he worked to support. After successfully being elected, Pulido appointed Sarmiento as the city's housing development commissioner. In January 2007, he was appointed to the Santa Ana City Council representing Ward 1 in order to complete the term of Jose Solorio who had been elected to the California State Assembly. The following year, he ran for a full term and was elected with 62.7% of the vote. He was subsequently reelected to two further terms in 2012 and 2016.

Sarmiento launched his mayoral bid in 2020, running amongst a field of  five other candidates seeking to replace term-limited Mayor Pulido. His campaign ran on housing affordability and ending the city's contract with ICE. In the November 3 vote, Sarmiento was elected mayor with 33% of the vote, beating out second-place Claudia Alvarez by 10,000 votes. Sarmiento's bid was largely supported by younger voters whom he credited as the reason for his electoral success. On December 8, 2020, he was inaugurated as the first new mayor of Santa Ana in 26 years.

Electoral history

References

Notes

Footnotes 

1964 births
Living people
21st-century American economists
21st-century American lawyers
21st-century American politicians
American politicians of Bolivian descent
Bolivian emigrants to the United States
California city council members
California Democrats
Harvard Kennedy School alumni
Hispanic and Latino American mayors in California
Hispanic and Latino American politicians
Mayors of places in California
Orange County Supervisors
People from Inquisivi Province
People from Santa Ana, California
UCLA School of Law alumni
University of California, Berkeley alumni